Borovitsy is a rural locality (a selo) in Borisoglebskoye Rural Settlement, Muromsky District, Vladimir Oblast, Russia. The population was 108 as of 2010. There are 3 streets.

Geography 
Borovitsy is located 56 km northeast of Murom (the district's administrative centre) by road. Martynovo is the nearest rural locality.

References 

Rural localities in Muromsky District
Gorokhovetsky Uyezd